Acacia pinguifolia, commonly known as the Fat-leaved wattle or Fat-leaf wattle, is endemic to South Australia, and is listed as an endangered species. It is in the Plurinerves section of the Acacias.

Distribution and habitat
It is found on the southern Eyre Peninsula and has a disjunct population near Finniss in the south Lofty region. It mainly grows in sandy or hard alkaline soils, in open scrub or woodland.

History
The species was first described in 1947 by the botanist John McConnell Black, from a specimen collected on the Finniss River near Lake Alexandrina, in South Australia. The species epithet, pinguifolia, derives from the Latin adjective, pinguis ("fat") and the compounding root, -folius ("-leaved") to give a Botanical Latin adjective which describes the plant as being "fat-leaved".

See also
List of Acacia species

References

External links
Acacia pinguifolia occurrence data from Australasian Virtual Herbarium

Flickr images: Acacia pinguifolia

pinguifolia
Flora of South Australia
Fabales of Australia
Plants described in 1947
Taxa named by John McConnell Black